OCM may refer to:

 Observe, copy, modify, also known as observe, imitate, modify.
 OCM (gene), also known as LOC4951, a human gene
 O'Callaghans Mills, a small village in Ireland (local folkloric slang)
 Occupy Central Movement
 Ocean Colour Monitor, an instrument launched on the IRS-P4 satellite on 1999-May-26
 Office for Coordination and Management, a component of the European Space Agency
 Ohio Community Media, a newspaper company in the United States
 Oil cleansing method, an alleged skin-cleansing method
 Oil content meter, a measuring device used on Marine Oily Water Separators
 Oil-Cut Mud, in oil drilling parlance
 Oka Chinna Maata, 
 Olympic Council of Malaysia
 On-camera meteorologist
 One Caribbean Media
 Online Condition Monitoring, for maintenance
 Open Cloud Manifesto, also known as the Cloud Computing Manifesto
 Optical Channel Monitor, a device for optical performance monitoring in fiber-optic communications networks
 Oracle Certified Master, a designation in the Oracle Certification Program
 Oracle Configuration Manager, a service of Oracle Corporation
 Ordo Sancti Constantini Magni, Order of Saint Constantine the Great
 Organisation civile et militaire (English "Civilian and Military Organisation"), a group of the French Resistance
 Organizational Change Management
 Oriental Carpet Manufacturers, a London-based company involved in the production of, and trade with, Oriental carpets
 Oxidative coupling of methane
 Boolgeeda Airport, IATA airport code "OCM"